is a passenger railway station located in the city of Nankoku, Kōchi Prefecture, Japan. It is operated by the third-sector Tosa Kuroshio Railway with the station number "GN38".

Lines
Only local trains on the line stop at the station.

Layout
The station consists of a side platform serving a single elevated track. There is no station building but the platform has a shelter for waiting passengers. Access to the platform is by means of a flight of steps. A toilet building has been step up under the elevated structure.

Adjacent stations

Station mascot
Each station on the Asa Line features a cartoon mascot character designed by Takashi Yanase, a local cartoonist from Kōchi Prefecture. The mascot for Tateda Station is a girl in a blue flight attendant's uniform named . A statue of this mascot is located near the steps leading to the platform. The toilet building nearby also shares the aviation theme by having decorative propellers protruding from the roof. The choice of theme is based on the fact that Tateda near to Kōchi Airport.

History

Passenger statistics
In fiscal 2011, the station was used by an average of 24 passengers daily.

Surrounding area
Nankoku Municipal Konan Junior High School
Nankoku Municipal Nissho Elementary School
Kochi National College of Technology
Faculty of Agriculture, Kochi University

See also 
List of railway stations in Japan

References

External links

Railway stations in Kōchi Prefecture
Railway stations in Japan opened in 2002
Nankoku, Kōchi